Formula One, abbreviated to F1, is the highest class of open-wheeled auto racing series administered by the Fédération Internationale de l'Automobile (FIA), motorsport's world governing body. The "formula" in the name alludes to a series of rules set by the FIA to which all participants and vehicles are required to conform. A points scoring system is used for each Grand Prix held over the course of the F1 season to determine the outcome of two annual championships, one for drivers (World Drivers' Championship) since , and one for constructors (World Constructors' Championship) since . Each driver accumulates championship points individually in the World Drivers' Championship and collectively for the team they compete for in the World Constructors' Championship. At the conclusion of the season, both championships are officially presented at the end-of-season FIA Prize Giving Ceremony held in various locations to the participant and team with the most points attained.

 348 drivers have scored Drivers' Championship points, and 70 out of 170 teams have scored Constructors' Championship points, in 1,081 World Championship races. On two occasions involving three drivers, second drivers of teams that officially entered only one car were ineligible for points.

Michael Schumacher has the longest time between his first points score and his last. Max Verstappen is the youngest driver to tally a championship point; he finished seventh at the  when he was 17 years and 180 days old.

History 
The points scoring has been changed several times throughout F1 history. Participants in every season until  could only achieve Drivers' Championship points for their best-placed finishes in a specified maximum number of races. Up until , most years saw only the highest-scoring participant in each Grand Prix for each constructor contributing points towards the Drivers' title. In , the FIA revised the structure to the top eight finishers of each race.

Half points were awarded for six  that were red-flagged before a certain threshold in a race progression was reached (at different times being either 60% or 75% of the scheduled race distance); starting from around 1977 to 1980 until the end of the 2021 season, no points were able to be accumulated should a race conclude early with the leader having completed two or fewer laps. No points can be scored unless two or more racing laps are completed by the race leader without the intervention of the safety car or virtual safety car. Only drivers finishing in the top five positions are eligible for championship points should the race leader complete more than two racing laps but cover less than 25% of race distance. That switches to the top nine places should the race leader complete between 25% and 50% of race distance. If the race leader covers between 50% and 75% of race distance then participants finishing in the top ten positions tally points. Full championship points are tallied should the race leader complete 75% or more of the scheduled race distance. Following initial confusion over how points were awarded at the 2022 Japanese Grand Prix, the FIA clarified the drivers are also eligible for full points if the race finishes under green flag conditions regardless of the percentage of the scheduled race distance that has been covered. 

The first eight drivers are awarded points in the three sprint races in 2022. 

The bonus point for fastest lap was reintroduced in  but only drivers and constructors who finished in the top ten are eligible to score the point. From 2022, the fastest lap point is only awarded if 50% or more of the scheduled race distance is completed. Unlike some other motor racing series (e.g., the IndyCar Series), F1 has never given extra points to drivers for leading the highest number of laps or qualifying on pole position.

Points scoring systems

Special cases

See also

 List of American Championship car racing points scoring systems
 List of NASCAR points scoring systems
 List of FIM World Championship points scoring systems

Notes

References
General
 

Specific

Bibliography

External links 
 Formula One official website
 FIA official website

Points scoring systems